The 1995–96 Copa del Rey was the 94th staging of the Copa del Rey.

The competition started on 6 September 1995 and concluded on 10 April 1996 with the Final, held at La Romareda in Zaragoza.

First round

Second round

Third round 

|}

First leg

Second leg

Bracket

Round of 16 

|}

First leg

Second leg

Quarter-finals 

|}

First leg

Second leg

Semi-finals 

|}

First leg

Second leg

Final

Top goalscorers

External links 
 www.linguasport.com 

Copa del Rey seasons
1995–96 in Spanish football cups